The 2013–14 Philippine Basketball Association (PBA) Philippine Cup Finals was the best-of-7 championship series of the 2013–14 PBA Philippine Cup, and the conclusion of the conference's playoffs. The Rain or Shine Elasto Painters and the San Mig Super Coffee Mixers competed for the 36th All-Filipino championship and the 110th overall championship contested by the league.

The Mixers won the championship in six games.

Background

Road to the finals

Head-to-head matchup

Series summary

Game 1

In the last two minutes of the game, the Elasto Painters took the lead 78–76 through a back-to-back three point shots by Jeff Chan. Tim Cone then re-inserted his starters and James Yap come up with two consecutive jumpers to gain back the lead, 80–78 with 34.7 seconds left. Jeff Chan missed a three-point attempt in the next play but Jervy Cruz got the rebound and made a hook shot to tie the game, 80-all with 22.5 seconds remaining. After the Mixers' timeout, they let the time go by until it reaches 8.7 seconds and called another timeout to draw up the possible game-winning basket, anchoring the play either to James Yap or Mark Barroca. Yap was not able to get the ball and Barroca missed his attempt while driving to the basket. In the next play, Yeng Guiao designed a play to make Jeff Chan a decoy to enable other players to be open. In-bounding the ball is Gabe Norwood who saw Paul Lee freed up with his defender, passed the ball to him to make the layup and to gain the lead, 82–80. Tim Cone called for a timeout he didn't have, resulting for a technical foul and a free throw made by Lee. The Mixers were forced to inbound the ball at the other end of the basket with .9 seconds left and failed to make the desperation shot.

Game 2

Game 3

Game 4

Game 5

Game 6

Rosters

{| class="toccolours" style="font-size: 95%; width: 100%;"
|-
! colspan="2" style="background-color: #; color: #; text-align: center;" | San Mig Super Coffee Mixers 2013–14 Philippine Cup roster
|- style="background-color:#; color: #; text-align: center;"
! Players !! Coaches
|-
| valign="top" |
{| class="sortable" style="background:transparent; margin:0px; width:100%;"
! Pos. !! # !! POB !! Name !! Height !! Weight !! !! College 
|-

                                      
           

  

  
 

{| class="toccolours" style="font-size: 95%; width: 100%;"
|-
! colspan="2" style="background-color: #; color: #; text-align: center;" | Rain or Shine Elasto Painters 2013–14 Philippine Cup roster
|- style="background-color:#; color: #; text-align: center;"
! Players !! Coaches
|-
| valign="top" |
{| class="sortable" style="background:transparent; margin:0px; width:100%;"
! Pos. !! # !! POB !! Name !! Height !! Weight !! !! College 
|-

Broadcast notes

Additional Game 6 crew:
Trophy presentation: Dominic Uy
Dugout interviewer: Erika Padilla

References

External links
PBA official website

2014
2013–14 PBA season
Rain or Shine Elasto Painters games
Magnolia Hotshots games
PBA Philippine Cup Finals